Walther Krause (31 December 1890 – 25 October 1960) was a German general during World War II. He was a recipient of the Knight's Cross of the Iron Cross of Nazi Germany.

Awards and decorations

 Knight's Cross of the Iron Cross on 10 June 1943 as Generalmajor and commander of 170. Infanterie-Division

References

Citations

Bibliography

1890 births
1960 deaths
20th-century Freikorps personnel
German Army personnel of World War I
German prisoners of war in World War II held by the United States
Lieutenant generals of the German Army (Wehrmacht)
People from Świdnica
People from the Province of Silesia
Prussian Army personnel
Recipients of the clasp to the Iron Cross, 1st class
Recipients of the Gold German Cross
Recipients of the Knight's Cross of the Iron Cross
Reichswehr personnel
German Army generals of World War II